Nadia Boubeghla (born in Algiers, Algeria) is an Algerian politician. She is a member of the Workers' Party.

References

Living people
People from Algiers
Workers' Party (Algeria) politicians
21st-century Algerian women politicians
Year of birth missing (living people)
21st-century Algerian politicians